Ruislip Football Club was a semi-professional football club based in Ruislip, West London. They played in the Southern League during the 1980s.

History
The club joined the Premier Division of the Middlesex League in 1981, replacing Ruislip Town who had left in 1980 after finishing last in league for two consecutive season. They finished second-from-bottom of the Premier Division in their first season and ended the 1983–84 season in last place. The league then became the Middlesex County League. Despite only finishing eleventh in the league's inaugural season, Ruislip moved up to the Southern Division of the Southern League.

Ruislip finished bottom of the Southern Division in 1988–89, after which they left the league and subsequently folded.

Ground
The club played at Breakspear Road, which was taken over by Hillingdon Borough in 1990, later being renamed the Middlesex Stadium.

Records
Best FA Cup performance: First qualifying round, 1988–89
Best FA Vase performance: First round, 1988–89

See also
Ruislip F.C. players

References

Defunct football clubs in England
Middlesex County Football League
Southern Football League clubs
Defunct football clubs in London
1981 establishments in England
Association football clubs established in 1981
1989 disestablishments in England
Association football clubs disestablished in 1989
Sport in the London Borough of Hillingdon